Białystok bus station ( known also as PKS NOVA Bus Station is a bus station in Białystok, capital of Podlaskie Voivodeship in north-east Poland. It has been located in Bohaterow Monte Cassino street since 1986.

History
In February 1974 cornerstone was laid to a bus station in the station's current location. There were constant delays in construction and two work stoppages. In In 1986 the new bus station was opened. A local news paper, referring to the fact that the original plans could not be implemented yet, a long waited moment had come: 
In 2016, a tender was announced for the construction of a new bus station with the winner announced as Budner. On March 1, 2017, a notarial deed was signed between PKS Nova and the Budner Company regarding the transfer of 45% of the station area at Bohaterow Monte Cassino street. In exchange for the land received, Budner demolishd the old and built a new station complex. Two small shopping malls were to be built on the site handed over to the contractor. On May 29, 2017, the foundation act was laid, officially starting the construction of the new facility, which was put into use on December 11, 2017.

Operations

Various national and regional carriers have their operations in the bus station. The bus station is used as a connection point to the neighbouring countries Belarus and Lithuania. PKS Nova operates coaches to most major cities in Poland and to many smaller cities in Podlaskie Voivodeship.

Carriers
Ecolines
Flixbus
Voyager
PlusBus
Zak Express

See also
Białystok railway station

References

1984 establishments in Poland
Bus stations in Poland
Buildings and structures in Białystok
Transport in Białystok
Transport infrastructure completed in 1984

pl:Dworzec autobusowy w Białymstoku